The Azure Mountain Fire Observation Station is a historic fire observation station located on Azure Mountain at Waverly in Franklin County, New York. The tower is a prefabricated structure built by the Aermotor Corporation to provide a front line of defense in preserving the Adirondack Forest Preserve from the hazards of forest fires.

It was added to the National Register of Historic Places in 2001.

References

External links

The Fire Towers of New York

Government buildings on the National Register of Historic Places in New York (state)
Government buildings completed in 1918
Towers completed in 1918
Buildings and structures in Franklin County, New York
Fire lookout towers in Adirondack Park
Fire lookout towers on the National Register of Historic Places in New York (state)
National Register of Historic Places in Franklin County, New York